The Wright Pulsar Gemini was a design of double-decker bus bodywork built onto VDL DB250LF chassis by Wrightbus between 2003 and 2006. It was visually almost identical to the Wright Eclipse Gemini that was mounted on the Volvo B7TL and later Volvo B9TL chassis.

In 2007, Wrightbus launched the Wright Gemini 2 integral double-decker with VDL DB300 chassis modules as the successor to the Pulsar Gemini in both diesel and hybrid-electric forms.

Features
As with the Wright Eclipse Gemini, this bus has both the upper and lower deck front windscreens forming part of a single oval shape, with the destination display in between. In London, they have two doors for passenger loading, one at the front and one in the centre. The staircase is situated between the front and centre entrances.

Operators 
The Pulsar Gemini was ordered almost exclusively by Arriva UK Bus, with its Arriva London subsidiary purchasing 133 examples between 2003 and 2005, numbered in the DW series, and Arriva Midlands purchasing 32 for use in Leicester in 2006, which were numbered 4746-77, sharing the 47xx series numbers in the Midlands fleet with other DAF DB250s (with East Lancs Mylennium Lowlanders being numbered 4701-45 and ex-Arriva London Alexander ALX400s being numbered 4778 onwards). 

While Arriva London's Pulsar Geminis have been sold or cascaded to regional fleets, the majority of Arriva Midlands' Pulsar Geminis presently remain in use with their original operator on their original network in Leicester, for much of their career being solely based at Thurmaston, although because they are now Arriva's oldest buses in Leicester, many of them are set for withdrawal in the coming years. As of September 2022 ten of the Midlands' Pulsar Geminis have been withdrawn, one in an accident in April 2019 and the remainder from late 2021 onwards, with five being withdrawn in September 2022 alone. In spring 2022, two Pulsar Geminis were also transferred from Leicester to High Wycombe, the first major transfer since two were briefly painted red and branded for the X50 service between Derby and Stoke on Trent in the early 2010s. 

Konectbus purchased five Wright Pulsar Geminis in 2005.

Pulsar Gemini HEV

The Wright Pulsar Gemini HEV was the hybrid-electric variant of the Pulsar Gemini, introduced in 2006. It was the first hybrid double-decker to be built in the United Kingdom. It was based on the same VDL DB250 chassis as the diesel Pulsar Gemini, but with the DAF engine removed and replaced with a smaller Ford Duratorq engine coupled to a hybrid-electric driveline. Only three Pulsar Gemini HEVs were built – as detailed below – before the model was superseded by the introduction of the Wright Gemini 2 HEV in 2007.

Production vehicles
The first Wright Pulsar Gemini HEV was unveiled by Mayor of London Ken Livingstone in October 2006. After being exhibited at the Euro Bus Expo at the National Exhibition Centre, in March 2007 it entered service with Arriva London on route 141 for evaluation. In 2008 it moved to East Thames Buses' Mandela Way garage for six months, mainly being used on route 1. From August 2010 until February 2012, it operated for First Somerset & Avon in Bath after having its centre door removed.

The second production Pulsar Gemini HEV was delivered to Dublin Bus of Ireland in late 2008. It was withdrawn in January 2012 and sold to Ensignbus, where it caught fire on June 9, 2012 due to an electrical fault.

The third and final Pulsar Gemini HEV to be completed was delivered to London General and entered service in 2009. It left the fleet in early 2012 and its current whereabouts are unknown.

Gallery

References

External links

Wrightbus product description for Pulsar Gemini HEV

Double-decker buses
Low-floor buses
Hybrid electric buses
Vehicles introduced in 2003
Pulsar Gemini